Chris Barker is the American chair professor of linguistics at New York University, famous for his discovery of the universal iota combinator and his continuation-based approach to scope.

Barker received a bachelor’s degree in English from Yale College in 1983, and both a bachelor’s degree in computer and information sciences in 1986, and a doctorate in linguistics in 1991 from the University of California, Santa Cruz

Selected works
 Barker & Chan 2014: Continuations and Natural Language. 
 Barker 2001: Iota and Jot - the simplest languages?

References

External links

Year of birth missing (living people)
Living people
Linguists from the United States
New York University faculty
Yale College alumni
University of California, Santa Cruz alumni